Amélie Oksenberg Rorty (May 20, 1932 – September 18, 2020)  was a Belgian-born American philosopher known for her work in the philosophy of mind (in particular on the emotions), history of philosophy (especially Aristotle, Spinoza
and Descartes), and moral philosophy.

Career 
Rorty received her B.A. from the University of Chicago in 1951, M.A. and Ph.D. degrees from Yale University in 1954 and 1961 respectively, and an M.A. from Princeton University in anthropology (where she has projected getting a second Ph.D.). She began her academic career at Wheaton College (Mass.) (1957–1961), then began teaching at Rutgers (Livingston College) in 1962 and taught there through to 1988, by which time she had achieved the rank of distinguished professor. She was also professor in the history of ideas (and director of the program) at Brandeis University from 1995 to 2003, and from 2008 to 2013 was visiting professor at Boston University. , she was a visiting professor at Tufts University. She was also a lecturer in the Department of Global Health and Social Medicine, Harvard School of Medicine. Rorty was the recipient of numerous awards and fellowships over the course of her career: Center for Advanced Study in the Behavioral Studies (1968-1969), King's College, Cambridge (1971-1973), Institute for Advanced Study (1980-1981), John Simon Guggenheim (1990-1991), Woodrow Wilson Center (1994-1995), and the National Humanities Center (2007-2008).

Work
Rorty primarily worked on problems in moral psychology and moral education. She was especially interested in the many distinctive –-and often conflicting—functions of morality as a social practice, as it sets prohibitions, projects ideals, defines duties, and characterizes virtues. Exploring the dark side of some of the virtues—for example, courage as bravado, integrity as moral narcissism, ambivalent love—she analyzed the advantages of resistance to the obligations of morality, including the benefits of self-deception, the lures of moral weakness, the wisdom of ambivalence, and hidden rationales for allegedly irrational emotions. She approached many of these issues historically (through Aristotle, Spinoza, Hume and Freud) and anthropologically (projecting a study of exiles, immigrants, and refugees who perforce absorb a new set of 'moral' values.) Her final project was an unfinished book provisionally titled On the Other Hand: The Ethics of Ambivalence.

Rorty is the author of more than 120 scholarly articles. She wrote or edited more than a dozen scholarly books of original essays. A monograph, Mind in Action: Essays in Philosophy of Mind, was published by Beacon Press in 1988 (paperback edition 1991). She also edited and contributed to Explaining Emotions (U. California Press, 1980), Essays on Aristotle's Ethics (1980, U.California Press), and co-edited Essays on Aristotle's De Anima (Oxford, 1992) with Martha Nussbaum. She initiated and served as general editor of Modern Studies in Philosophy (Doubleday-Anchor) and of Major Thinkers (University of California Press). Other notable books she edited include The Many Faces of Evil (Routledge, 2001), The Identities of Persons (1976, U. California Press) and The Many Faces of Philosophy (Oxford, 2000).

Personal life
Amélie Oksenberg, daughter of Polish Jews Klara and Israel Oksenberg, was born in Belgium and emigrated with her parents to Virginia, where she was raised on a farm. She enrolled at a young age at the University of Chicago, and went on to pursue a doctorate at Yale, where she married Richard Rorty, a fellow graduate student and philosopher.  They had a son, Jay, and divorced in 1972. She wrote about her upbringing in "Dependency, Individuality and Work" and in "A Philosophic Travelogue," The Dewey Lecture, American Philosophical Association, Proceedings and Addresses, vol. 88, 2014.

Additional awards and fellowships
 1971–1973, Fellow, King's College, Cambridge 
 1984–1985, Visiting Honorary Research Associate, Philosophy, Harvard University
 1980–1981, Member, Institute for Advanced Study
 1990–1991, John Simon Guggenheim Fellow
 1994–1995, Woodrow Wilson Center Fellow
 2001–2002, Distinguished Woman Philosopher of the Year, Society for Women in Philosophy
 2007–2008, Fellow, National Humanities Center

References

External links
 A 2010 interview of Rorty on self-deception on Why? Radio (Institute for Philosophy in Public Life)

1932 births
2020 deaths
American women philosophers
Philosophers of mind
Philosophers from Illinois
Jewish philosophers
20th-century American philosophers
Historians of philosophy
20th-century American women
Belgian emigrants to the United States
Belgian people of Polish-Jewish descent
American people of Polish-Jewish descent
21st-century American women